173 (one hundred [and] seventy-three) is the natural number following 172 and preceding 174.

In mathematics
173 is:
an odd number.
a deficient number.
an odious number.
a balanced prime.
an Eisenstein prime with no imaginary part.
a Sophie Germain prime.
an inconsummate number.
the sum of 2 squares: 22 + 132.
the sum of three consecutive prime numbers: 53 + 59 + 61.
Palindromic number in bases 3 (201023) and 9 (2129).

In astronomy
 173 Ino is a large dark main belt asteroid
 173P/Mueller is a periodic comet in the Solar System
 Arp 173 (VV 296, KPG 439) is a pair of galaxies in the constellation Boötes

In the military
 173rd Air Refueling Squadron unit of the Nebraska Air National Guard
 173rd Airborne Brigade Combat Team of the United States Army based in Vicenza
 173rd Battalion unit of the Canadian Expeditionary Force during the World War I
 173rd Surveillance Squadron (Australia) of the Australian Army at Oakey, Queensland
 K-173 Chelyabinsk Russian  
  was a U.S. Navy Phoenix-class auxiliary ship following World War II
  was a U.S. Navy  during World War II
  was a U.S. Navy  during World War II
  was a U.S. Navy  during World War II
  was a U.S. Navy yacht during World War I
  was a U.S. Navy  ship during World War II
  was a  U.S. Navy submarine chaser during World War II
  was a U.S. Navy Porpoise-class submarine during World War II
  was a U.S. Navy  following World War II
 Vought V-173 (Flying Pancake) was a U.S. Navy experimental test aircraft during World War II

In transportation
 United Airlines Flight 173 en route from Denver to Portland crashed on December 28, 1978
 The Velocity 173 was a kit aircraft produced by Velocity Aircraft in the early '90s.

In popular culture
 The book "173 Hours in Captivity" (2000)
 SCP-173, a fictional statue

In other fields
173 is also:
 The year AD 173 or 173 BC
 173 AH is a year in the Islamic calendar that corresponds to 789 – 790 CE
 The atomic number of an element temporarily called Unsepttrium
 Topic of discussion during the podcast "Skeptics with a K" episode 180

See also
 List of highways numbered 173
 United Nations Security Council Resolution 173
 United States Supreme Court cases, Volume 173

External links

 Number Facts and Trivia: 173
 Prime curiosities: 173
 Number Gossip: 173

References 

Integers